Musashi-Koganei Station (武蔵小金井駅, Musashi-Koganei-eki) is a passenger railway station located in the city of Koganei, Tokyo, Japan, operated by East Japan Railway Company (JR East).

Lines

Station layout
The station has two elevated island platforms serving four tracks, with the station building located underneath. The station has a Midori no Madoguchi staffed ticket office.

Platforms

History
The station opened on 15 January 1926.
The station became part of the JR East network after the privatization of the JNR on April 1, 1987.

Passenger statistics
In fiscal 2019, the station was used by an average of 62,565 passengers daily (boarding passengers only). The passenger figures for previous years are as shown below.

Surrounding area
 Tama Cemetery
 Tokyo Gakugei University
 Koganei Park
 Edo-Tokyo Open Air Architectural Museum

See also
 List of railway stations in Japan

References

External links

  

Stations of East Japan Railway Company
Railway stations in Tokyo
Railway stations in Japan opened in 1926
Chūō Main Line
Koganei, Tokyo